Marcel Sartos was a Belgian boxer. He competed in the men's flyweight event at the 1928 Summer Olympics. During the Olympics, he defeated Hyman Miller. Hyman's elimination caused controversy, and Jacob Stumpff petitioned General MacArthur to withdraw the American team from the games.

References

Year of birth missing
Year of death missing
Belgian male boxers
Olympic boxers of Belgium
Boxers at the 1928 Summer Olympics
Place of birth missing
Flyweight boxers